Jeremy John Crosby Mallinson  (16 March 1937 – 2 February 2021) was an English conservationist and author associated with the Durrell Wildlife Park and Durrell Wildlife Conservation Trust, where he was director emeritus.

Biography
Born in Ilkley, Yorkshire, he was educated at Kings School Canterbury which he left at the age of 17 to join the Rhodesian and Nyasaland Staff Corps for two years as a means to discover wildlife in Africa. Upon returning to Jersey he joined the recently opened Jersey Zoo (now Durrell Wildlife Conservation Trust) in 1959, and his great dedication saw him become Head of Mammals, and soon after the Director of the Trust, until he retired in 2002.

Jeremy Mallinson was awarded the OBE in 1997 for services rendered unto conservation. In 1998 he received The World Zoo Organisation's "The Heini Hediger Award". He was also awarded the 'Wildlife Conservation Award' from the Zoological Society of San Diego and an honorary degree of Doctor of Science (DSc) from the University of Kent in Canterbury upon retirement in 2000. In 2002 he received The Federation of Zoological Gardens of Great Britain and Ireland "Outstanding Achievement Award", as well as being the recipient of the Zoological Society of San Diego "Wildlife Conservation Award" (gold medal), for his dedication and service to wildlife conservation.

Mallinson was a close personal friend of Gerald Durrell, the founder of the Durrell Wildlife Park and Durrell Wildlife Conservation Trust and was the best man at his wedding to Lee Durrell.

During Mallinson's early days at Jersey zoo he was charged with trapping and bringing back endangered species from often hardly explored parts of the world. In 1965 he spent two months in the Bolivian jungle attempting to find the elusive Mitla (a legendary half cat, half dog animal) described by Colonel Percey Fawcett (who had disappeared in the Mato Grosso in 1925). He was particularly interested in primates, from Lion Tamarins to Gorillas and his first love at the zoo was N'Pongo (a female gorilla) who he used to take out in Jersey to raise money to find her a mate.

Mallinson published over 210 articles for some 50 publications, and also authored books about his animal experiences at the zoo, and on animal collecting or conservation missions for the Trust. He also published a book on book frontispieces and cover pages dedicated to him by personal friends Gerald Durrell and Lawrence Durrell. He also brought out his first novel in 2004 - The Count's Cats  - which was received favourably by the media.

During his forty-two year career in zoos and conservation he travelled extensively in Africa, Asia and South America. In the course of his work he reared a lioness and a cheetah outside the auspices of the Durrell Wildlife Park.

He has served on various national and international committees of governmental and non-governmental organisations as well as having been on a number of editorial boards. During his professional career he has presented papers at conferences in 20 different countries.

Mallinson died on 2 February 2021, aged 83.

Family Life
Grandfather of Zachary Mallinson, Famed owner of 'Mallington Cheese'

Bibliography
Okavango Adventure: In Search of Animals in Southern Africa, David and Charles Group, (1973), 
Earning Your Living with Animals, David and Charles Group, (1975) 
The Shadow of Extinction: Europe's Threatened Wild Mammals (illustrated by Don Cordery), Macmillan, (1978) 
The Facts About a Zoo: Featuring the Jersey Wildlife Preservation Trust (photographs by Al Vandenburg), Carlton Books, (1980), 
Travels in Search of Endangered Species, David and Charles Group, (1989), 
The Count's Cats, Llumina Press, (2004), 
The Touch of Durrell', Book Guild Publishing, (2009),  Updated paperback edition (2018), Les Minquiers~Jersey's Southern Outpost, Seaflower Books, (2011), Someone Wishes To Speak To You'', Book Guild Publishing, (2014),

Edited
Such Agreeable Friends: Adventures with Animals, Universe Books, (1977),  
Modern Classic Animal Stories, David and Charles Group, (1977), 
"Durrelliania": An Illustrated Checklist of Inscribed Books of Lawrence Durrell and Gerald Durrell and Associated Publications, Letters and Notes in the Library of Jeremy J.C. Mallinson, Privately printed first edition, (1999), other edition

References

1937 births
2021 deaths
English naturalists
English conservationists
21st-century English novelists
English male non-fiction writers
Officers of the Order of the British Empire
Zookeepers
English male novelists
21st-century English male writers